The Zee Cine Award Best Actor in a Comic Role is chosen by a jury organized by Zee Entertainment Enterprises, and the winner is announced at the ceremony.

Winners

See also

 Zee Cine Awards
 Bollywood
 Cinema of India

Zee Cine Awards